Josephine Koo Mei-Wah or Gu Meihua is a Chinese film actress. She had a bright start to her film career, starring in Yim Ho's Hong Kong New Wave classic Homecoming (1984). The film won her the Best New Performer Award at the Hong Kong Film Awards in 1985, and also a nomination for Best Actress, but she was beaten by Siqin Gaowa from the same film.

After Homecoming, Koo appeared in Yim Ho's Red Dust (1990), Stanley Kwan's Full Moon in New York (1990) and Evans Chan's To Live(e) (1992).

She disappeared from the screen in the late 1990s but suddenly returned in Peng Xiaolian's Shanghai Story (2004). For her role in this film, Koo was awarded the Best Actress Award at the Shanghai International Film Festival, beating out Zhang Ziyi and Joey Wong.

Filmography
 Missing (2019)
 Cherry Returns (2016)
 Helios (2015)
 Tales from the Dark 1 (2013)
 Shanghai Story (2004)

References

External links
 
 HK cinemagic entry

1952 births
Koo, Josehine
Living people
Chinese film actresses
20th-century Hong Kong actresses
21st-century Hong Kong actresses
Actresses from Shanghai